A flail  is a weapon consisting of a striking head attached to a handle by a flexible rope, strap, or chain.  The chief tactical virtue of the flail was its capacity to strike around a defender's shield or parry.  Its chief liability was a lack of precision and the difficulty of using it in close combat, or closely-ranked formations.

There are two broad types of flail: a long, two-handed infantry weapon with a cylindrical head, and a shorter weapon with a round metal striking head. The longer cylindrical-headed flail is a hand weapon derived from the agricultural tool of the same name, commonly used in threshing. It was primarily considered a peasant's weapon, and while not common, they were deployed in Germany and Central Europe in the later Late Middle Ages.  The smaller, more spherical-headed flail appears to be even less common; it appears occasionally in artwork from the 15th century onward, but many historians have expressed doubts that it ever saw use as an actual military weapon.

The peasant flail 

In the Late Middle Ages, a particular type of flail appears in several works being used as a weapon, which consists of a very long shaft with a hinged, roughly cylindrical striking end.  In most cases, these are two-handed agricultural flails, which were sometimes employed as an improvised weapon by peasant armies conscripted into military service or engaged in popular uprisings.  For example, in the 1420–1497 period, the Hussites fielded large numbers of peasant foot soldiers armed with this type of flail.

Some of these weapons featured anti personnel studs or spikes embedded in the striking end, or are shown being used by armored knights, suggesting they were made or at least modified specifically to be used as weapons. Such modified flails were used in the German Peasants' War in the early 16th century.  Several German martial arts manuals or Fechtbücher from the 15th, 16th and 17th century feature illustrations and lessons on how to use the peasant flail (with or without spikes) or how to defend against it when attacked.

The military flail 

The other type of European flail is a shorter weapon consisting of a wooden haft connected by a chain, rope, or leather to one or more striking ends. The kisten, with a non-spiked head and a leather connection to the haft, is attested in the 10th century in the territories of the Rus', probably being adopted from either the Avars or Khazars. This weapon spread into central and eastern Europe in the 11th–13th centuries.
Artwork from the 15th century to the early 17th century shows most of these weapons having handles longer than 3 ft and being wielded with two hands, but a few are shown used in a single hand or with a haft too short to be used two-handed.

Despite being very common in fictional works such as cartoons, films and role-playing games as a "quintessential medieval weapon", historical information about flails other than the kisten or derivatives of the peasant flail is somewhat scarce. Some doubt they were used as weapons at all due to the few genuine specimens as well as the unrealistic way they are depicted in art.
Waldman (2005) documented several likely authentic examples of the ball-and-chain flail from private collections as well as several restored illustrations from German, French, and Czech sources.  Nonetheless, he states that the scarcity of artifacts and artistic depictions, combined with the almost complete lack of text references, suggests they were relatively rare weapons and never saw widespread use. One of the reasons was the hazard the weapon posed to its wielder, especially the varieties with long chains and short handles. A missed swing would still retain momentum, and, even if a blow were struck, there may have been a long time before the user could ready another swing.

Variations outside Europe 

In Asia, short flails originally employed in threshing rice were adapted into weapons such as the nunchaku or three-section staff. In China a very similar weapon to the long-handled peasant flail is known  as the two-section staff, and Korea has a weapon called a pyeongon. In Japan, there is also a version of the smaller ball-on-a-chain flail called a chigiriki.

In the 18th and 19th centuries, the long-handled flail is found in use in India. An example held in the Pitt Rivers Museum has a wooden ball-shaped head studded with iron spikes. Another in the Royal Armouries collection has two spiked iron balls attached by separate chains.

The knout, a whip or scourge formerly used in Russia for the punishment of criminals, was the descendant of the flail. It was manufactured in many forms, and its effect was so severe that few of those who were subjected to its full force survived the punishment. The Emperor Nicholas I substituted for the knout a milder whip.

Gallery

See also 
 Mace (bludgeon)
 Morning star
 Nunchaku
 Two-section staff
 Pyeongon
 chigiriki

References

External links 

 Observations on flail use in European history

Formal insignia
Flail weapons
Medieval weapons
Wands
Ritual weapons
Honorary weapons
Ceremonial weapons